Döğer can refer to:

 Döğer, Dicle
 Döğer (tribe)